Andrei Șaguna National College is a Romanian state school located in Șcheii Brașovului, the historically Romanian neighbourhood of Brașov. The school educates children aged between 11 (5th grade – gymnasium) and 19 years old (12th grade – high school). It is considered to be the 5th best school in the country (2014, 2015).

Since its founding in 1850, the school has had a number important Romanian personalities as either alumni or former teachers, including Lucian Blaga, Augustin Bunea, Gheorghe Bogdan-Duică, Emil Cioran, Gheorghe Dima, Octavian Goga, Vasile Goldiş, Titu Maiorescu, Ciprian Porumbescu, and Dumitru Stăniloae.

References

Saguna
Educational institutions established in 1850
National Colleges in Romania
Historic monuments in Brașov County
1850 establishments in the Austrian Empire
School buildings completed in 1851